UPstarters is a reality dance show which aired on Udaya TV and Sun TV from 7 June 2015. The judges of the show were Dhanush, Rachita Ram and Puneeth Rajkumar, Andrea Jeremiah, Silambarasan, Amala Paul. The show was sponsored by 7 Up.

The participants were from South India. The team ′Cheer Ambassadors′ won in the final.

Game progression

Season summary and episode format

Episodes

List of episodes

References

2010s Indian television series
Tamil-language television shows
Indian reality television series
Dance competition television shows
Sun TV original programming